The Journey Prize (officially called The Writers' Trust of Canada McClelland & Stewart Journey Prize) is a Canadian literary award, presented annually by McClelland and Stewart and the Writers' Trust of Canada for the best short story published by an emerging writer in a Canadian literary magazine. The award was endowed by James A. Michener, who donated the Canadian royalty earnings from his 1988 novel Journey.

The winner receives , making it the largest monetary award given in Canada to an up-and-coming writer for a short story or excerpt from a fiction work-in-progress.

The prize's winner in 2000, Timothy Taylor, was the first writer ever to have three stories nominated for the award in the same year.

The Journey Prize also publishes an annual anthology of the year's longlisted short stories. Two writers, Andrew MacDonald and David Bergen, have both had a record four total stories selected for inclusion in the annual anthology.

In 2020, the Journey Prize committee announced that the 2021 award will be a special edition devoted exclusively to Black Canadian writers, considering stories published in 2019, 2020 and 2021. The 2022 award will return to considering stories by all writers, including stories published in 2020 and 2021 which were not eligible for the 2021 award due to its special focus.

Winners and nominees

1980s

1990s

2000s

2010s

2020s

References

External links
Journey Prize

Writers' Trust of Canada awards
Awards established in 1989
1989 establishments in Canada
Short story awards
Canadian fiction awards
English-language literary awards